Damaged Goods (1914) is an American silent film directed by Tom Ricketts, starring Richard Bennett. It is based on Eugène Brieux's play Les Avariés (1901) about a young couple who contract syphilis. No print of the film is known to exist, making it a lost film. It is believed to have begun the sex hygiene/venereal disease film craze of the 1910s.

The play was adapted into a British silent film Damaged Goods in 1919. A sound film based on the Brieux play, also titled Damaged Goods (1937) was directed by Phil Goldstone, released by Grand National Pictures.

Cast

Richard Bennett as George Dupont
Adrienne Morrison as a Girl of the Streets
Maud Milton as Mrs. Dupont
Olive Templeton as Henriette Locke
Josephine Ditt as Mrs. James Forsythe
Jacqueline Moore as Seamstress
Florence Short as Nurse
Louis Bennison as Dr. Clifford
John Steppling as Senator Locke
William Bertram as a Quack Doctor
George Ferguson as the Quack's Assistant
Charlotte Burton as Mrs. Lester

Production and release history
Film historian Terry Ramsaye stated that the film was "pretentiously made" for a cost of less than $50,000, including marketing, and that "its states' rights ... sold for $600,000, thus indicating a box-office take of probably more than $2,000,000". According to a 1915 account, audience demand for the film in Detroit was so great that police were required to control the crowds at the theater.

Damaged Goods was re-released in a "new edition" in 1917, perhaps in response to concerns about the spread of venereal disease among World War I soldiers. It was re-released again in 1919.

Reception
The film was positively received by critics. Reviews in Variety and The Moving Picture World praised it as morally salubrious.

See also
List of lost films

References

External links

Damaged Goods entry in the AFI Catalog of Feature Films

1914 films
1914 drama films
American silent feature films
American black-and-white films
Films about syphilis
Lost American films
1914 short films
Silent American drama films
American films based on plays
American Film Company films
1914 lost films
Lost drama films
Films directed by Tom Ricketts
1910s American films
1910s English-language films